Hubert Hien is an Upper Volta football midfielder who played for Upper Volta in the 1978 African Cup of Nations, where he scored the team's first ever goal in the competition. He also played for Rail Club du Kadiogo.

References

External links
 

Association football midfielders
Burkinabé footballers
Burkina Faso international footballers
1978 African Cup of Nations players
Rail Club du Kadiogo players
Living people
Year of birth missing (living people)
21st-century Burkinabé people